"The Lastest Gun in the West" is the twelfth episode of the thirteenth season of the American animated television series The Simpsons. It first aired on the Fox network in the United States on February 24, 2002. In the episode, Bart meets a retired Western star named Buck McCoy who soon becomes his idol. After McCoy shows the Simpsons some of his films, they help him revive his acting career.

The episode was directed by Bob Anderson and written by John Swartzwelder, who based the script on a story idea pitched by fellow Simpsons writer Ron Hauge. The episode features Dennis Weaver as the retired Western actor Buck McCoy, Frank Welker as the vicious dog, and Karl Wiedergott as an alcoholic resembling Walter Brennan.

When it was first broadcast, "The Lastest Gun in the West" was seen by 5.9% of the American population between ages 18 and 49. It has garnered mixed reviews from critics.

Plot
When a vicious dog chases Bart, he takes refuge in the garden of a house belonging to former Western actor Buck McCoy. After Buck shows Bart a trick to calm the dog, Bart starts to hero-worship him. Naturally, Homer learns about Bart's new idol and demands he worship him instead.

To help revive Buck's career, Bart lands him a job on Krusty the Clown's show. However, Buck gets drunk before the show and makes a fool of himself, culminating in him shooting Krusty live on air. Seeing how crushed Bart is, Marge and Homer help Buck overcome his alcoholism by cleaning his house and enrolling him in an Alcoholics Anonymous program. Despite making progress, Buck fails to restore Bart's hero-worship.

When Homer sees a news report about a robbery at the Bank of Springfield, he convinces Buck to foil the robbery and become a hero. Buck subdues the bank robbers and again becomes a hero in Bart's eyes. After acknowledging everything Homer has done, Bart declares him a hero too. As the episode ends, Bart is again chased by the vicious dog.

Production

”The Lastest Gun in the West” was written by John Swartzwelder and directed by Bob Anderson. It was first broadcast on the Fox network in the United States on February 24, 2002.

Writing
The idea for the episode was pitched by Simpsons writer Ron Hauge, who thought it would be interesting to see an episode in which Bart would run into a retired Western film star in the neighborhood and "think he was the coolest guy in the world", although the actor had seen better days. Hauge suggested that Swartzwelder, who is an avid Western fan, would be the appropriate writer for the episode. Swartzwelder also pitched the plot idea about the angry dog who chases Bart in the episode.

Animation
The design for Buck McCoy was primarily based on Dennis Weaver, who portrayed him in the episode, as well as aspects of other western actors such as Roy Rogers and John Wayne. McCoy's costume in the fictional television show McTrigger was based on the attire worn by the main character in real-life television series McCloud. The design for the dog went through several different model changes until the Simpsons staff settled on the "very angry bull-terrier design" seen in the episode. A scene in the episode shows McCoy showcasing an array of films he starred in to the Simpson family through a movie projector. In order to achieve the strobe light effect done by the projector, the animators painted every other frame white and then blank.

Casting

The episode features American actor Dennis Weaver, famous for his role in the television show Gunsmoke, in a guest role as the Western actor Buck McCoy. Al Jean, the show runner for the episode, stated in the DVD commentary that Weaver was very funny, a ”terrific guy”, and that it was an honor to meet him. Karl Wiedergott, an actor who usually fills in for unavailable male cast members during table reads for The Simpsons episodes, portrayed an alcoholic resembling Walter Brennan. The dog was played by voice artist Frank Welker.

Cultural references
The episode title, which is often wrongfully referred to as "The Latest Gun In the West", is a pun based on the term "the fastest gun in the west". A scene in the episode shows McCoy auditioning for a spot in the Krusty the Clown show. To showcase his skills, McCoy shoots a Krusty cardboard cutout in the crotch. The scene is a reference to an incident on The Tonight Show Starring Johnny Carson, in which Ed Ames hit a mannequin in the crotch while demonstrating a tomahawk throw. Carson's quips during the incident are referenced in Krusty's line "Ooh, right in the panhandle." Carson can also be seen in one of the clips before Krusty's show in the episode, along with poet Robert Frost. The inside of McCoy's house is loosely based on the inside of Will Rogers' house in Will Rogers State Historic Park. "McTrigger", the last TV series McCoy starred in, is a parody of the American television police drama McCloud, in which Weaver played the lead; McCoy claims the series was eventually retooled into Room 222. In one scene, Homer shows Bart a poster of himself dressed as Farrah Fawcett in her iconic red swimsuit poster.

Release
In its original American broadcast on February 24, 2002, "The Lastest Gun In the West", along with a rerun of Malcolm in the Middle, put Fox in second place for the night among adults between ages 18 and 49. According to Nielsen Media Research, the episode received a 5.9 rating, meaning it was seen by 5.9% of the population in said demographic. On August 24, 2010, the episode was released as part of The Simpsons: The Thirteenth Season DVD and Blu-ray set.

Following its television broadcast, "The Lastest Gun in the West" received a lot of negative feedback from The Simpsons fans. The Simpsons staff — who, according to Jean, are susceptible to criticism — were surprised by the amount of scorn the fans showed towards the episode. Jean, who thought the episode was "great", stated in the DVD commentary for the episode that he "[has] never been able to quite figure [why the fans disliked the episode] out", and speculated that, since Westerns have not been popular since the 1960s, "they [The Simpsons fans] just don't care about them at all."

Following the home video release of the thirteenth season of The Simpsons, reviews of "The Lastest Gun in the West" were mixed.

On the negative side, describing the episode as a "clunker", Jennifer Malkowski of DVD Verdict stated that the episode is "frightfully thin" and criticized the premise as being "lazy".

Nate Boss of Project:Blu criticized the premise as well, writing that the episode was "just a couple jokes thrown together" rather than a complete story.

Writing for Blu-ray.com, Casey Broadwater described the episode as being "just plain dull".

However, Colin Jacobson of DVD Movie Guide praised the episode as "offer[ing] good laughs" and wrote that, while the episode was not "brilliant", it was overall "an enjoyable experience."

Giving the episode a positive review as well, Ron Martin of 411Mania described the episode as being "easily one of the best of the season".

References

External links

The Simpsons (season 13) episodes
2002 American television episodes
Television shows written by John Swartzwelder

it:Episodi de I Simpson (tredicesima stagione)#L'ultima pistola del west
fi:Simpsonit (13. tuotantokausi)#Viimeinen lännensankari (The Lastest Gun in the West)